Jennifer Batten's Tribal Rage: Momentum is the second studio album by guitarist Jennifer Batten, released on August 5, 1997, through East West Records and reissued in June 2008 through Lion Music.

Critical reception

John W. Patterson at All About Jazz gave Jennifer Batten's Tribal Rage: Momentum a glowing review, saying "I've never heard anyone do anything quite like Batten's continuous stream of note-bending, tapping, swells, controlled feedback, harmonics, and lightning-fast riffs." He likened the album to Batten's popular guitarist peers, but also that "She goes beyond [Steve] Vai's insane excursions and tops it off by tipping her hat and then running past [Joe] Satriani's finer weirdness." Praise was also given to her supporting musicians: "There is some seriously cool bass work and severely challenging percussion happening here as well."

Track listing

Personnel

Jennifer Batten – guitar, guitar synthesizer, keyboard, talk box, background vocals (tracks 1, 4)
Glen Sobel – drums, percussion
Ricky Wolking – bass, banjo, talk box, background vocals (tracks 1, 4)
Chris Tervitt – spoken vocals (track 4)
Sean Wiggins – spoken vocals (track 6), background vocals (tracks 1, 4)
Benny Collins – spoken vocals (track 7)
Bret Helm – background vocals (tracks 1, 4)
Janis Massey – background vocals (tracks 1, 4)
Sylmarian Pygmee choir – background vocals (tracks 1, 4)
Bill Cooper – engineering
Shay Baby – engineering
Jimmy Crichton – engineering
DeWayne Barron – engineering
Rick James, Jr. – engineering
Pat Thrasher – engineering
Erik Zobler – mixing
Steven Stuart Short – mixing
David Mitson – mastering

References

External links
Jennifer Batten's Tribal Rage "Momentum" at Guitar Nine Records (archived)

Jennifer Batten albums
1997 albums
East West Records albums